The Salza (also Mariazeller Salza) is an eastern tributary of the Enns. It originates on the mountain  in Lower Austria and flows South of Mariazell through the Styrian nature preserve . After , it flows into the Enns near  (part of Landl).

Today the water of the reservoir is used to power a small electric power plant. Downstream from the reservoir, the Salza is a favorite site for kayakers.

Numerous springs of small tributaries of the Salza have been captured and are used for the Viennese water supply.

References

External links

Rivers of Lower Austria
Rivers of Styria
Rivers of Austria